Cloonanaha (less often Clounanaha) is a small village and townland in County Clare, Ireland. 

The village of Cloonanaha is just off the R460 road to the west of Inagh. It has a small school called Cloonanaha National School. Cloonanaha is within the civil parish of Inagh and the barony of Inchiquin.
It is in the Catholic parish of Inagh and Kilnamona. It contains the Oratory of The Blessed Mary Ever Virgin.

See also
 List of towns and villages in Ireland

References

Towns and villages in County Clare